The 2009 D.C. United season was the fourteenth season of the team's existence. It began on March 22, 2009, with a 2–2 draw at the Los Angeles Galaxy and ended on October 22, 2009, at the Kansas City Wizards by the same 2–2 scoreline.

Off-season
D.C. United was involved in the following off-season activity:

Draft

The 2009 MLS SuperDraft took place on January 15, 2009. With draft order determined by regular and post-season record, United received the sixth pick in each round. Additionally, United acquired the Colorado Rapids' first-round pick (#7 overall) and Houston Dynamo's second-round (#26 overall). United's fourth-round (#51 overall) pick went to Colorado.

Re-signings
Santino Quaranta – January 6, 2009
Bryan Namoff – January 6
Marc Burch – January 7
Francis Doe – January 21
Devon McTavish – January 28

Signings
Andrew Jacobson – February 10
Dejan Jakovic – February 27
Brandon Barklage – March 3
Anthony Peters – March 3
Milos Kocic – March 12

Released
Marcelo Gallardo – January 30

Waived
Ryan Miller – March 25

Transactions

Loaned

Squad

First-team squad
As of August 25, 2009. For recent transfers, see List of transfers for the 2009 Major League Soccer season.

Season transactions

Trades

Waived
April 23 – Francis Doe

Statistical leaders
Last updated 4 May 2009

Goals
Luciano Emilio – 10
Jaime Moreno – 9
Christian Gomez – 6

Assists 
Santino Quaranta – 6
Christian Gomez - 4
Bryan Namoff - 4

Minutes
Clyde Simms – 2,457
Bryan Namoff – 2,326
Rodney Wallace – 2,265

Fouls committed
Rodney Wallace – 52
Ben Olsen – 36
Marc Burch - 27

Fouls suffered
Santino Quaranta – 40
Ben Olsen – 35
Chris Pontius – 35

Club

Management

Other information

Competitions
Key

Overall

Preseason

Carolina Challenge Cup

Major League Soccer

Standings 
Eastern Conference

Overall table

Results summary

Results by round

Match results

CONCACAF Champions League

Group standings

Preliminary round

Group stage

U.S. Open Cup

Transfers

In

Out

Loan in

Loan out

References

External links 
2009 Schedule

D.C. United seasons
DC United
DC United
2009 in sports in Washington, D.C.